Kjellén is a surname. Notable people with the surname include: 

Johan Fredrik Kjellén (1881–1959), Swedish politician
Lillebil Kjellén (1921–1994), Swedish actress
Rudolf Kjellén (1864–1922), Swedish political scientist, geographer and politician